Ariobarzanes (in Greek Ἀριoβαρζάνης; reigned 266 BC – c. 250 BC) was the second king of Pontus, succeeding his father Mithridates I Ctistes in 266 BC. He died in an uncertain date between 258 and 240 BC. He obtained possession of the city of Amastris in Paphlagonia, which was surrendered to him. Ariobarzanes and his father sought the assistance of the Gauls, who had come into Asia Minor twelve years before the death of Mithridates, to expel the Egyptians sent by Ptolemy II Philadelphus. Ariobarzanes was succeeded by Mithridates II.

References
Hazel, John; Who's who in the Greek world, (1999), "Ariobarzanes"
Memnon, History of Heracleia, Andrew Smith (translator), (2004)
Smith, William (editor); Dictionary of Greek and Roman Biography and Mythology, "Ariobarzanes III" , Boston, (1867)

Notes

Mithridatic kings of Pontus
Ancient Persian people
3rd-century BC Iranian people
3rd-century BC monarchs
Year of birth unknown
250s BC deaths